Embarrassment of Riches is a 6-song "albumette" by Elephant Micah which was released September 29, 2006 on Micah's own LRRC label. The record was unveiled at a record release party at Micah's alma mater, Earlham College. In late October, the album was reviewed by the Denver Post, probably the largest media publication to review an Elephant Micah release to date.

Track listing
"Feedback, So Long"
"The Ecstasy (Insomnia, Plus One)"
"Events Near Dove Cottage"
"What Directions"
"Red Roving"
"False Aspirants"

References

Elephant Micah albums
2006 EPs